This is a list of nonprofit organizations with notable activities related to bitcoin.

References

Bitcoin